In geometry, a sectrix of Maclaurin is defined as the curve swept out by the point of intersection of two lines which are each revolving at constant rates about different points called poles. Equivalently, a sectrix of Maclaurin can be defined as a curve whose equation in biangular coordinates is linear. The name is derived from the trisectrix of Maclaurin (named for Colin Maclaurin), which is a prominent member of the family, and their sectrix property, which means they can be used to divide an angle into a given number of equal parts. There are special cases known as arachnida or araneidans because of their spider-like shape, and Plateau curves after Joseph Plateau who studied them.

Equations in polar coordinates
Eliminate  to get 
We assume  is rational, otherwise the curve is not algebraic and is dense in the plane.

so
 
is the equation in polar coordinates.

The case  and  where  is an integer greater than 2 gives arachnida or araneidan curves
 

The case  and  where  is an integer greater than 1 gives alternate forms of arachnida or araneidan curves
 

A similar derivation to that above gives
 
Note that this is the earlier equation with a change of parameters; this to be expected from the fact that two poles are interchangeable in the construction of the curve.

Equations in the complex plane, rectangular coordinates and orthogonal trajectories
In the notation of the previous section, we have 
 or 
.
If  then , so the equation becomes
 or 
.  This can also be written
 
from which it is relatively simple to derive the Cartesian equation given m and n. The function 
 is analytic so the orthogonal trajectories of the family  are the curves , or

Parametric equations
Then converting the polar equation above to parametric equations produces
 .
Applying the angle addition rule for sine produces
 .
So if the origin is shifted to the right by a/2 then the parametric equations are
. 
These are the equations for Plateau curves when , or  
.

Inversive triplets
The inverse with respect to the circle with radius a and center at the origin of
 
is
.
This is another curve in the family. The inverse with respect to the other pole produces yet another curve in the same family and the two inverses are in turn inverses of each other. Therefore each curve in the family is a member of a triple, each of which belongs to the family and is an inverse of the other two. The values of q in this family are 
.

Sectrix properties
Let  be a given angle and suppose that the sectrix of Maclaurin has been drawn with poles  and  according to the construction above. If  is the angle of this line then

so 
.
Thus, the curve is an m-sectrix, meaning that with the aid of the curve an arbitrary angle can be divided by any integer. This is a generalization of the concept of a trisectrix and examples of these will be found below.

and subtracting  gives an angle of 
.
Applying the Euclidean Algorithm again gives an angle of  showing that the curve is also an n-sectrix.

(This is, in fact, one of the Apollonian circles of P and P'''.) Let  be the point intersection of this circle and the curve. Then 

so 
.

Specific cases
q = 0
This is the curve 
 
which is a line through .

q = 1
It has polar equation
. 
It is the inverse with respect to the origin of the q = 0 case.

q = -1
These curves have polar equation 
,
complex equation  In rectangular coordinates this becomes
 which is a conic. So the conics are, in fact, rectangular hyperbolas. The center of the hyperbola is always . The orthogonal trajectories of this family are given by 
 which is the family of Cassini ovals with foci 

Trisectrix of Maclaurin
. 
This is the Trisectrix of Maclaurin which is specific case whose generalization is the sectrix of Maclaurin. The construction above gives a method that this curve may be used as a trisectrix.

Limaçon trisectrix and rose
.
This is the Limaçon trisectrix.

The equation with the origin take to be the other pole is the rose curve that has the same shape
.
The 3 in the numerator of q'' and the construction above give a method that the curve may be used as a trisectrix.

References
"Sectrice de Maclaurin" at Encyclopédie des Formes Mathématiques Remarquables (In French)

Curves
Algebraic curves